The German icebreaker Hindenburg was built by Stettiner Oderwerke at Stettin-Grabow in 1915 for the Cooperative Merchants' Guild of Stettin. The ship was launched on 15 December 1915 but not completed until 23 December 1916. During the Invasion of Åland in February 1918, the Hindenburg was part of Transportflotte I of the Sonderverband Ostsee. Three crew members died in the event.:The wreck was found 1995 at 50 meters by diveinstructor Richard Johansson from Maltaproffsen and his crew from Ålands Dykcenter and FF-Dyk.

References
Notes

Bibliography

Ships built in Stettin
1915 ships
Hindenburg
Ships sunk by mines
World War I shipwrecks in the Baltic Sea
Maritime incidents in 1918